Thomas Wyndham may refer to:
 Thomas Wyndham of Felbrigg (died 1521), vice-admiral and counsellor to Henry VIII
 Thomas Wyndham (Royal Navy officer) (1508–1554), navigator and son of Thomas Wyndham (of Felbrigg)
 Thomas Wyndham (of Tale) (c. 1628–1713), Member of Parliament for Minehead and Yarmouth (Isle of Wight)
 Thomas Wyndham (of Witham Friary) (c. 1642–1689), Member of Parliament for Wells
 Thomas Wyndham (lawyer) (1662–1698), Member of Parliament for Wilton
 Thomas Wyndham, 1st Baron Wyndham (1681–1745), Lord Chancellor of Ireland
 Thomas Wyndham (of Clearwell Park) (c.1686–1752), Member of Parliament for Dunwich and Truro
 Thomas Wyndham (of Hammersmith) (c.1693–1777), Member of Parliament for Poole
 Thomas Wyndham (of Dunraven Castle) (c. 1763–1814), Member of Parliament for Glamorganshire
 Thomas Wyndham (clergyman) (1772–1862), English Doctor of Divinity